Malkangiri (Sl. No.: 146) is a Vidhan Sabha constituency of Malkangiri district, Odisha.

This constituency includes Malkangiri, Malkangiri block, Kalimela block, Podia block and 7 Gram panchayats (Tandiki, Chalanguda, Matapaka, Tandapalli, Gorakhunta, Sikhapalli, Badili, Korukonda and Tumusapali) of Korukunda block.

Elected Members

Seventeen elections were held between 1951 and 2019 including one By election in 1992.
Elected members from the Malkangiri constituency are:
2019: (146): Aditya Madhi (BJP)
2014: (146): Manas Madkami (BJD)  
2009: (146): Mukunda Sodi (BJD)  
2004: (146): Nimai Chandra Sarkar (Congress)
2000: (146): Arabinda Dhali (BJP)
1995: (146): Arabinda Dhali (BJP)
1992: (By Poll): Arbinda Dhali (BJP)
1990: (86): Naka Kannaya (Janata Dal)
1985: (86): Nadiabasi Biswas (Independent)
1980: (86): Naka Laxmaya (Congress-I)
1977: (86): Naka Kannaya (Janata Party)
1974: (86): Naka Kannaya (Utkal Congress)
1971: (81): Gangadhar Madi (Orissa Jana Congress)
1967: (81): Gangadhar Madi (Congress)
1961: (6): Guru Nayak (Ganatantra Parishad)
1957: (4): Madakami Guru (Ganatantra Parishad)
1951: (1): Laxman Gauda (Ganatantra Parishad)

2019 Election Result

2014 Election Result
In 2014 election, Biju Janata Dal candidate Manas Madkami defeated Indian National Congress candidate Mala Madhi by a margin of 3,312 votes.

2009 Election Result
In 2009 election, Biju Janata Dal candidate Mukunda Sodi defeated Indian National Congress candidate Nabin Chandra Madkami by a margin of 10,906 votes.

Notes

References

Assembly constituencies of Odisha
Malkangiri district